Beihu District is one of two urban districts in Chenzhou Prefecture-level City, Hunan province, China.

The district is located in the southwestern part of the city proper. It is bordered to the northeast by Suxian District, to the southeast by Yizhang County, to the south by Linwu County, to the west and northwest by Guiyang County. The district has eight subdistricts, two towns and two townships under its jurisdiction. the government seat is Luoxian Subdistrict.

Administrative divisions
8 subdistricts
 Beihu
 Chenjiang
 Luoxian
 Renminlu
 Xiameiqiao
 Yanquan
 Yongquan
 Zengfu

2 towns
 Huatang
 Lutang

2 ethnic townships
 Baohe Yao ethnic township
 Yangtianhu Yao ethnic township

References
Beihu District

 
County-level divisions of Hunan
Geography of Chenzhou